McKim is a surname. Notable people with the surname include:

McKim, West Virginia
Ann McKim (clipper), famous Baltimore clipper, built in 1833

People with the surname McKim
Alexander McKim (1748–1832), U.S. Representative from Maryland
Andrew McKim (born 1970), retired Canadian ice hockey centre
Charles Follen McKim FAIA (1847–1909), American Beaux-Arts architect
Donald K. McKim (born 1950), American theologian
Isaac McKim (1775–1838), U.S. Representative from Maryland, nephew of Alexander McKim
James Miller McKim (1810–1874), Presbyterian minister and an abolitionist
Josephine McKim (later Chalmers) (1910–1992), American swimmer
Lucy McKim Garrison, American song collector, contributor to Slave Songs of the United States
Nick McKim (born 1965), Australian politician
Robert McKim (actor) (1886–1927), American actor
Robert McKim (Ontario politician) (1828–1900), Ontario farmer and political figure
Robert McKim (philosopher) (born 1952), philosopher of religion
Robert McKim (Wyoming politician) (born 1946), member of the Wyoming House of Representatives
Ruby McKim (1891–1976), English quilt designer, entrepreneur, and writer
Sammy McKim (1924–2004), Canadian film actor

See also
7845 Mckim (1996 AC), a Main-belt Asteroid discovered in 1996
McKim, Mead, and White, prominent architectural firm in the eastern US at the turn of the 20th century
McKim Observatory, astronomical observatory owned and operated by DePauw University
McKim's School, historic school located at Baltimore, Maryland, United States